The 2019 Rallye Deutschland (also known as ADAC Rallye Deutschland 2019) was a motor racing event for rally cars that was held over four days between 22 and 25 August 2019. It marked the thirty-seventh running of Rallye Deutschland and was the tenth round of the 2019 World Rally Championship, World Rally Championship-2 and the newly-created WRC-2 Pro class.

Ott Tänak and Martin Järveoja were the defending rally winners. Their team, Toyota Gazoo Racing WRT, were the defending manufacturers' winners. The Škoda Motorsport crew of Jan Kopecký and Pavel Dresler were the defending winners in the World Rally Championship-2 category, but they did not defend their titles as they were promoted to the newly-created WRC-2 Pro class.

Tänak and Järveoja successfully defended their titles to get German hat-trick. Their team, Toyota Gazoo Racing WRT, won the rally and covered all three podium places for the first time since 1993 Safari Rally. The Škoda Motorsport crew of Jan Kopecký and Pavel Dresler took their first victory of the season in the WRC-2 Pro category, finishing first in the combined WRC-2 category, while the local crew of Fabian Kreim and Tobias Braun won the wider WRC-2 class.

Background

Championship standings prior to the event
Ott Tänak and Martin Järveoja led both the drivers' and co-drivers' championships with a twenty-two-point ahead of defending world champions Sébastien Ogier and Julien Ingrassia. Thierry Neuville and Nicolas Gilsoul were third, a further three points behind. In the World Rally Championship for Manufacturers, Hyundai Shell Mobis WRT held a twenty-four-point lead over Toyota Gazoo Racing WRT.

In the World Rally Championship-2 Pro standings, Kalle Rovanperä and Jonne Halttunen held a thirty-eight-point lead ahead of Mads Østberg and Torstein Eriksen in the drivers' and co-drivers' standings respectively. Gus Greensmith and Elliott Edmondson were third, another thirteen points further back. In the manufacturers' championship, Škoda Motorsport led M-Sport Ford WRT by three points, with Citroën Total sixty-one points behind in third.

In the World Rally Championship-2 standings, Benito Guerra and Jaime Zapata led the drivers' and co-drivers' standings by eighteen points respectively. Pierre-Louis Loubet and Vincent Landais crew and Nikolay Gryazin and Yaroslav Fedorov crew tied in second.

Entry list
The following crews entered into the rally. The event opened to crews competing in the World Rally Championship, World Rally Championship-2, WRC-2 Pro and privateer entries not registered to score points in any championship. A total of fifty-five entries were received, with eleven crews entered with World Rally Cars and nineteen entered the World Rally Championship-2. Four crews were nominated to score points in the Pro class.

Route
The competitive distance was increased from the 2018 event, while the liaison sections were shortened. The second leg features with a new format, with a pair of stages run twice in the morning and another pair run twice in the afternoon. This differs from the traditional format where all stages are run once before the second pass in the afternoon.

Itinerary
All dates and times are CEST (UTC+2).

Report

World Rally Cars
The M-Sport Ford WRT crew of Elfyn Evans and Scott Martin were expected to return, having been forced to miss Rally Finland when Evans was injured in a pre-event testing crash. However, Evans' recovery time was subsequently extended, forcing him to miss Rallye Deutschland as well.

Ott Tänak held a narrow lead ahead of title rival Thierry Neuville going to the second leg. Teemu Suninen retired from Friday with mechanical problems. In Saturday afternoon, Tänak's two title rivals Neuville and Sébastien Ogier both suffered a puncture, which gave Toyota a dramatic 1-2-3. Eventually, three Toyotas came back safely to complete the first 1-2-3 finish in WRC since 2015 Rallye Deutschland.

Classification

Special stages

Championship standings

World Rally Championship-2 Pro
Kalle Rovanperä led the category with a 20-second margin going into Saturday, but the young Finn had a nightmare morning on Saturday, when he slid into the ditch twice. Kalle's mistakes handed his lead to his teammate Jan Kopecký. Eventually, he won his first Pro victory.

Classification

Special stages
Results in bold denote first in the RC2 class, the class which both the WRC-2 Pro and WRC-2 championships run to.

Championship standings

World Rally Championship-2
Stéphane Lefebvre held off fellow Frenchman Nicolas Ciamin until he crashed out his Polo during SS9. Unfortunately, Ciamin also crashed out in the following stage, which inherited the lead to local driver Fabian Kreim and handed him a fantastic home win.

Classification

Special stages
Results in bold denote first in the RC2 class, the class which both the WRC-2 Pro and WRC-2 championships run to.

Championship standings

Notes

References

External links
  
 2019 Rallye Deutschland in e-wrc website
 The official website of the World Rally Championship

Germany
2019 in German motorsport
August 2019 sports events in Germany
2019